Thanasis Dimopoulos (born 21 April 1963) is a retired Greek football striker. Alongside his brothers Christos Dimopoulos and Spyros he holds the world record for the highest number of siblings scoring on the same day, on 2 February 1992 in the Greek first division.

Career
He started his career from Ifaistos Vounargou, a fifth-division  club scoring 34 goals in the 1980-81 season. His performances impressed the league's champions Aias Gastouni who signed Dimopoulos for 1 million drachmas, a record for the division at the time. During his first season in the fourth division scored 25 goals helping his team finish 5th in the third group.Despite PAOK's interest where his brother Christos was playing, Panathinaikos signed him in the summer of 1982. He impressed coach Ștefan Kovács in his first season with the Greens scoring 17 goals, most of them after coming off the bench. Panathinikos' squad had then many experienced players such as Mike Galakos, Kostas Mavridis, Juan Ramón Rocha, Giannis Kyrastas, and Tschen La Ling, even reaching the European Cup's semifinals in 1984-85 losing out to champions Liverpool.Five years later he signed mid-season for Iraklis in a sqiad with players like Vasilis Hatzipanagis and Savvas Kofidis and helping his team qualify for the 1990-91 UEFA Cup. He moved to PAOK in 1992, while the 1994-95 season was his last in Alpha Ethniki with Ethnikos Piraeus.

International career
Dimopoulos was called up by coach Stefanos Petritsisto the U-21 national team when he was still a fourth-division player. In 1985 he was called to the senor national team and played 4 matches in total.

Honors

Individual
Greek Cup: Topscorer 1983-84

References

1963 births
Living people
Greek footballers
Super League Greece players
Panathinaikos F.C. players
Iraklis Thessaloniki F.C. players
PAOK FC players
Ethnikos Piraeus F.C. players
AO Chania F.C. players
Aiolikos F.C. players
Association football forwards
Greece under-21 international footballers
Greece international footballers
Greek football managers
Anagennisi Giannitsa F.C. managers
Panelefsiniakos F.C. managers
People from Elis
Footballers from Western Greece